Alex Mendham (born 13 September 1989 in Essex, England) is an English singer, saxophonist, and bandleader. He is best known as the founder and leader of Alex Mendham & His Orchestra.

Founding his orchestra in 2010, Mendham, who has been described as a very classic British gentleman with a flawless and sophisticated attire, has risen to become Britain's premier bandleader recreating the glamorous, romantic music of the 1920s and 1930s by replicating the authentic aura of every song using careful arrangements and instruments from the era. Performing in elegant attire from the Art Deco era, Alex and his Orchestra performed as the house band at London's luxurious Savoy Hotel, is frequently featured on BBC Radio and appeared on stage to sell out audiences in the UK, Europe and USA. He has been featured on the BBC and in journals including Forbes.          

In 2020, during the COVID-19 pandemic that devastated the livelihoods of musicians, Mendham signed to Decca Records for a project celebrating the career of Dame Vera Lynn, entitled Keep Smiling Through and recorded his uplifting compilation of hot jazz standards and romantic songs, Puttin' on the Ritz.

Discography
 Whistling in the Dark (2013)
 Jazznocracy (2015)
 On With The Show (2017)
Puttin' on the Ritz (2020)
Mendham launched a Kickstarter Campaign to fund his 2020 album exceeding his £7,000 goal with £11,120 pledged by 158 backers. Recording of the album and a series of concerts aboard Cunard's Queen Mary 2 on a transatlantic crossing to New York City was interrupted by the COVID-19 pandemic. However, when lock down restrictions were temporarily eased in the UK, Mendham succeeded in assembling the orchestra and recording the album.

References

External links
 Alex Mendham & His Orchestra's home page
https://vimeo.com/alexmendhamorchestra
https://www.bbc.co.uk/programmes/b07h6qlg
https://syncopatedtimes.com/alex-mendham-and-the-classic-british-dance-band/

1989 births
Living people
Big band bandleaders
English male singers
English jazz saxophonists